Dimitris Koukoulopoulos (born 1984) is a Greek mathematician working in analytic number theory. He is a professor at the University of Montreal.

In 2019, in joint work with James Maynard, he proved the Duffin-Schaeffer conjecture.

He was an invited speaker at the 2022 International Congress of Mathematicians.

Publications

References

Living people
1984 births
21st-century Greek mathematicians
Number theorists
Complex analysts
Academic staff of the Université de Montréal
Greek emigrants to Canada